Jane Frances Aaron (April 16, 1948 – June 27, 2015) was an American filmmaker and children's book illustrator, best known for her work on Between the Lions and Sesame Street. Aaron mixed live-action shots and animated images to teach children the alphabet, counting skills, and opposites, such as front and back or full and empty.

Early life and education
Jane Aaron was born in Manhattan to Sam Aaron and Florence Goldberg. Aaron attended the High School of Music & Art and graduated from Boston University with a bachelor's degree in fine arts.

Career
In addition to her animation work, Aaron illustrated the When I'm... book series written by Barbara Gardiner. She also worked with Oralee Wachter on two films about child sexual abuse and prevention, No More Secrets for Me and Close to Home. The films were later made into books illustrated by Aaron.

Aaron's independent films have been shown at the Whitney Biennial and the Museum of Modern Art. Permanent collections of her work exist at the Museum of Modern Art, the Metropolitan Museum of Art, the Hirshhorn Museum and Sculpture Garden and the Walker Art Center. She received a Guggenheim Fellowship in 1985.

Personal life
She married Skip Blumberg on January 17, 1988, with whom she had one son, Timothy Aaron. Aaron died of cancer in Manhattan on June 27, 2015, aged 67. In addition to her husband and son, she was survived by her mother and three siblings.

References

External links

1948 births
2015 deaths
People from Manhattan
American children's book illustrators
Artists from New York City
Deaths from cancer in New York (state)
Boston University College of Fine Arts alumni
Animators from New York (state)
American women illustrators
The High School of Music & Art alumni
American women animators
21st-century American women